Tituš Brezovački (January 4, 1757 – October 29, 1805) was a Croatian playwright, satirist and poet.

Brezovački, as the great comedian of the period, wrote all of his dramatic works in Kajkavian dialect. His poems were chiefly written in German and Latin, but few of them have also been preserved in Ijekavian Štokavian, as if predicting the path of Croatian national revival.

Biography
He was born in Zagreb, schooled in Zagreb and Varaždin, and in 1774 he entered the Pauline Order. He initiated the study of theology in 1776 in Lepoglava, and afterwards graduated philosophy and theology in Pest. He was ordained in 1781, serving as a gymnasium professor in Varaždin henceforth. In 1785 the Pauline Order was abolished, causing Brezovački to become a common priest. His disputes with clergy and the bishop Maksimilijan Vrhovac had often forced him to relocate, changing parishes (Varaždin, Križevci, Rakovac, Zagreb, Krapina, Požega, Zagreb). 

He wrote his first known work, the religious drama Sveti Aleksij for the gymnasium in Varaždin, where it was staged before being printed in Zagreb in 1786. In Križevci he wrote the Latin poem Dalmatiae, Croatie et Slavoniae, trium sororum recursus (Three sisters Dalmatia, Croatia, Slavonia), published in 1790, which represented a strong political shift in his work. This was followed by a similar poem Ode inclytae nobilitati regnorum Dalmatiae, Croatiae, Sclavoniae, printed in 1800, to encourage resistance against Napoleon.  During this period, he was a vocal critic of the higher clergy in Zagreb, which he criticized in the poem Jeremijaš nad horvatskoga orsaga zrušenjem narekujuči by the end of the 18th century, ending its censorship in 1801. He dedicated another poem to the newly constructed foundation hospital located on today's Ban Jelačić Square in 1804.

Between 1803 and 1805, he wrote his most known works; a comedy about a sorcerer Matijaš Grabancijaš dijak (first staged in 1804) and Diogeneš.

He died in Zagreb on October 29, 1805, exhausted by a lung disease.

Works

Drama
 "Sveti Aleksij", a drama (1786)
 "Matijaš Grabancijaš dijak", a comedy (1804)
 "Diogeneš ili sluga dveh zaljubljenih bratov", a comedy (1805)

Poetry
 Dalmatiae, Croatie et Slavoniae, trium sororum recursus, 1790
 Ode inclytae nobilitati regnorum Dalmatiae, Croatiae, Sclavoniae, 1800

Satire
 "Jeremijaš nad hrvatskoga orsaga zrušenjem nerekujuči", written around 1800

Footnotes

References 
 
 Tituš Brezovački on Enciklopedija.hr

1757 births
1805 deaths
Writers from Zagreb
Croatian dramatists and playwrights
Croatian male poets
German-language poets
New Latin-language poets